Oriol Bohigas i Guardiola (20 December 1925 – 30 November 2021) was a Spanish architect and urban planner, known for his work in the modernization of Barcelona.

Early life
Bohigas was born in Barcelona, Spain, on 20 December 1925 in a Catalan bourgeois family. His father was the philologist  and he studied at the Institut-Escola de la Generalitat. During the Civil War he moved to Olot, province of Girona, where he continued his high school studies.

Bohigas graduated in architecture in 1951 from the Escuela Técnica Superior de Arquitectura de Barcelona (Barcelona School of Architecture), where in 1963 he obtained the title of Doctor of Architecture.

Career 
Bohigas was a critic of the architecture of his city and an advocate of modernity from as early as age 20. In 1950, the group "Grup d'Arquitectes i Tècnics Catalans per al Progrés de l'Arquitectura Contemporània" to which he belonged was condemned, as the censor considered that modern architecture was "leftist-separatist". In January of the following year, in the weekly Destino, he harshly criticized Francoist architecture and from there founded the "Grupo R" of modern architects.

At the beginning of the 1960s Bohigas founded the firm MBM Arquitectes with David Mackay and Josep Martorell, and published his first book Barcelona entre el Pla Cerdà i el barraquisme (Barcelona between the Pla Cerdà and the shantytown). In 1964, he joined the Escuela Técnica Superior de Arquitectura de Barcelona as a professor, and in 1977 he was elected its director, a position he held until 1980. He was a member of the political current of progressive Catalanism and the gauche divine, which combined the progressive, intellectual and anti-Franco bourgeoisie. 

In the first democratic mandate of the Barcelona City Council in 1980, Bohigas was appointed Urban Planning Delegate under the mayoralty of Narcís Serra, a position he held until 1984. He promoted the urban transformation of the city under his principle of "monumentalizing the periphery and functionalizing the center"; the neighborhoods would be equipped with facilities and infrastructures and the city center would be devoted to services and stores, with public schools.  When he left the delegation, he continued to maintain his urban planning commitment to the city from his private professional office. In the local elections of 1991, he joined the Socialists' Party of Catalonia candidacy as an independent. After being elected, mayor Pasqual Maragall named him head of Department of Culture with the mandate to provide the city with large cultural infrastructures.  On 5 April 1994, Oriol Bohigas resigned due to continuous postponements of his cultural projects caused by the city's post-Olympic economic crisis.

Bohigas' most important work as an urban planner was the modernization of Barcelona for the 1992 Summer Olympics. He designed, with his office partners, "La Vila Olímpica del Poblenou", which, built on the industrial district of Icària, allowed the city to open up to the sea through the arrangement of gardens, squares, communities and walkways. He also designed the "Port Olímpic". It was the period in which he designed buildings such as the Design Museum of Barcelona. For the Seville Expo '92, he designed the "Future Pavillion".

Bohigas' architectural style transited from Noucentisme to rationalism and his ideal of the city drew as much from Le Corbusier and Ludwig Mies van der Rohe as from Josep Lluís Sert and Republican Catalonia and that led him to be considered the father of modern and Olympic Barcelona.

Bohigas was also a cultural manager.

Personal life and death
In the 1970s he married architect , who was his office partner, with whom he had five children. His son Josep is also an architect.

With a progressive and republican political ideology, during the Catalan sovereignty challenge of the 2010s, he declared himself pro-independence and signed a manifesto in favor of a consultation on the right to self-determination of the Catalans.

Suffering from Parkinson's disease since 2015, Bohigas died on 30 November 2021 at the age of 95 at his home in Barcelona .

Awards
Some of the Bohigas' awards are:
Barcelona City Gold Medal of Artistic Merits (1986)
Medal of Urbanism of the Académie d'architecture (1988)
Sikkens Award (1989)
Gold Medal of Architecture from the CSCAE (1990)
Creu de Sant Jordi (1991)
The City of Barcelona Award of International Projection (1999)
Gold Medal from the Col·legi Oficial d'Arquitectes de Catalunya (2007)
National Award of Architecture (2006)
National Award of Culture (2011)
Gold Medal from the Generalitat de Catalunya (2013)

Architectural works 
Bohigas' best known works are:

  (1974)
 La Vila Olímpica del Poblenou and the Olympic Port (1992)
 "Pabellón del Futuro" of the Seville Expo '92 (1992)
 Palau Nou de La Rambla, Barcelona (1993)
 Pompeu Fabra University (2001)
 Offices building for the Trade Union UGT. Barcelona (2002–2008)
 Tecnocampus University in Mataró (2004–2011)
 Enlargement of the El Corte Inglés at Plaça de Catalunya (2004)
 Liceu Metropolitan station. Barcelona (2005–2008)
 Auditorium and Sala Gaudí in La Pedrera building from Gaudí. Barcelona (2005–2008)
 Central Police Station in Plaça Espanya. Barcelona (2005–2010)
 White tower in Plaça Europa. Hospitalet del Llobregat (2006–2010)
 La casa dels Xuklis in Barcelona (2006–2011)
 Offices building for RBA Editors. Barcelona (2007–2011)
 Disseny HUB Barcelona (2001–2003)
 Transformation of the area around the Station in Parma (Italy) (2001–2015)

Books
He published amongst others the following books:

 Els altis i baixos de l'arquitectura catalana (1961)
 Momentos estelares de la arquitectura (1961)
 Barcelona entre el plà Cerdà i el barraquisme (1963)
 La arquitectura moderna (1967)
 Contra una arquitectura adjetivada (1969)
 Polèmica d'arquitectura catalana (1970)
 Arquitectura española de la Segunda República (1970)
 Proceso y erótica del Diseño (1972)
 Once arquitectos (1976)
 Historia de las tipologías arquitectónicas (1979)
 Reconstrucció de Barcelona (1985)
 Combat d'incerteses. Dietari de records I (1989)
 Quatre maneres de fer arquitectura (1990)
 Dit o fet. Dietari de records II (1992)
 Barcelona olímpica: ciudad renovada (1992)
 El present des del futur (1996)
 Contra la incontinencia urbana. Reconsideración moral de la arquitectura y la ciudad (2004) 
 Passar Comptes. Dietari de records III (2012)

See also 

 Street names in Barcelona
 Urban planning of Barcelona

References

External links

 MBM Architects

1925 births
2021 deaths
20th-century Spanish architects
Architects from Catalonia
Barcelona municipal councillors
Deaths from Parkinson's disease
Members of the Académie d'architecture
Neurological disease deaths in Spain
People from Barcelona
Academic staff of the Polytechnic University of Catalonia
Polytechnic University of Catalonia
Spanish urban planners
Spanish magazine founders